Killing Bono is a 2011 comedy film directed by Nick Hamm, based on Neil McCormick's 2003 memoir Killing Bono: I Was Bono's Doppelgänger.

The film stars Ben Barnes as Neil McCormick, Robert Sheehan as Ivan McCormick and Martin McCann as Irish singer Bono. It marked the final film role of Pete Postlethwaite, who died three months before its release.

Plot
The film loosely recreates the story of young Irish rocker McCormick and his younger brother, Ivan, who attempt to become rock stars but can only look on as their secondary school friends form U2 become one of the biggest bands in the world.

Cast
Ben Barnes as Neil
Robert Sheehan as Ivan
Martin McCann as Bono
Stanley Townsend as Danny
Pete Postlethwaite as Karl
Krysten Ritter as Gloria
Peter Serafinowicz as Hammond
Hugh O'Conor as Gary
Aidan McArdle as Bill
Luke Treadaway as Nick
Justine Waddell as Danielle
Ralph Brown as Leo

Production
The film was shot in Northern Ireland, was funded by Northern Ireland Screen and was released by Paramount Pictures (the distributor of U2's film Rattle and Hum) in the United Kingdom and Ireland on 1 April 2011. Sony Music Entertainment released the film's soundtrack worldwide. The European premiere was held in the Savoy Cinema in Dublin.

Reception
On Rotten Tomatoes, the film holds an approval rating of 56% based on 43 reviews, with an average rating of 5.4/10. Metacritic assigned the film a weighted average score of 46 out of 100, based on 12 critics, indicating "mixed or average reviews".

Jeannette Catsoulis of The New York Times called the film "shapeless", and added that "like its deluded antihero, just doesn't know when to stop".

Noel Murray of The A.V. Club wrote "There's a difference between "funny" and "comedy", and the movie adaptation of Killing Bono tries way too hard to be nutty, at the expense of just getting across what McCormick knows."

According to Jesse Cataldo of Slant Magazine "[the film] never really gets going, mostly because it has no real idea of how to convey joy, pain, or any type of emotional progression".

Joshua Rothkopf of Time Out was more positive of Killing Bono. His reaction was: "Amadeus it's not, but as light transitional music, the film-which has Pete Postlethwaite's final performance, as a swishy landlord-is tuneful enough".

Jordan Mintzer of The Hollywood Reporter was also positive about the film, writing "This cleverly conceived, behind-the-scenes tale features fine lead performances and enough nods to the epic group's early days to interest fans outside the U.K."

References

External links

2011 comedy films
Bono
British comedy films
English-language Irish films
Films about brothers
Films about musical groups
Films based on non-fiction books
Films set in the 1970s
Films set in the 1980s
Films set in Ireland
Films shot in London
Films shot in Northern Ireland
Irish comedy films
U2 films
Films with screenplays by Dick Clement
Films with screenplays by Ian La Frenais
2010s English-language films
Films directed by Nick Hamm
2010s British films